Serge Hélan (born 24 February 1964 in Pointe-à-Pitre, Guadeloupe) is a retired French triple jumper, best known for his bronze medal at the 1995 World Indoor Championships. His personal best was 17.55 metres, achieved at the 1994 European Championships in Helsinki. This was a French record as well. He also competed in the long jump from time to time, his personal best was 8.12 metres.

International competitions

External links

1964 births
Living people
French male triple jumpers
French male long jumpers
French people of Guadeloupean descent
Athletes (track and field) at the 1992 Summer Olympics
Olympic athletes of France
European Athletics Championships medalists
Mediterranean Games bronze medalists for France
Mediterranean Games medalists in athletics
Athletes (track and field) at the 1993 Mediterranean Games